The 2016 IAAF Hammer Throw Challenge is the seventh edition of the annual, global series of hammer throw competitions organised by the International Association of Athletics Federations.

A total of thirteen meetings will feature on the circuit, with nine women's and ten men's contests spread across those events. The point scoring format is cumulative – the final standings were decided by the sum of athletes' three best throws on the circuit. Only the best throw by an athlete from each meet was taken into consideration.

Calendar
The 2016 series calendar mainly comprised IAAF World Challenge meetings, supplemented by the Prefontaine Classic (a Diamond League meet) and three non-IAAF meetings: the Grande Premio Brasil Caixa de Atletismo, István Gyulai Memorial and Paavo Nurmi Games. Performances from the Olympic Games are also valid for the series. The Golden Grand Prix, Meeting International Mohammed VI d'Athlétisme de Rabat, Brothers Znamensky Memorial and Karlstad Grand Prix were also dropped from the programme. The Jamaica International Invitational made its debut on the series. The FBK Games, Hanžeković Memorial and Rieti Meeting were initially to be included, but were later dropped.

Results

Men

Women

See also
2016 IAAF Diamond League

References

2016
IAAF Hammer Throw Challenge